Chakia is a constituency of the Uttar Pradesh Legislative Assembly covering the city of Chakia in the Chandauli district of Uttar Pradesh, India.

Chakia is one of five assembly constituencies in the Robertsganj Lok Sabha constituency. Since 2008, this assembly constituency is numbered 383 amongst 403 constituencies.

Election results

2022

2017
Sharada Prasad of the Bharatiya Janta Party, defeated Jitendra Kumar of the Bahujan Samaj Party by a margin of 20,063 votes during the 2017 Uttar Pradesh Legislative Elections.

References

External links
 

Assembly constituencies of Uttar Pradesh
Chandauli district